Robert Wesley Bushby (February 24, 1927 – October 14, 2018) was an American aircraft mechanic and aviator who designed the Bushby Mustang II, later called the Mustang Aeronautics Mustang II.  He was born in Joliet, Illinois, and started to learn to fly while in high school in Minooka, Illinois.

Life and career 
Bob's interest in airplanes started in grade school and at age ten he had his first airplane ride in a Ford Trimotor. His family moved to Minooka, Illinois in 1941. 
His first solo flight was in a Piper J-3 Cub in 1943 and he graduated from high school in 1944.
During his military service he attended aircraft maintenance school at Keesler Field in Biloxi, Mississippi, followed by time on Guam in the 4th Emergency Rescue Squadron as a B-17 Flight engineer.
In 1948 Bob graduated from the Lewis College in Lockport, Illinois aircraft maintenance course as an A&E mechanic (now referred to as "A&P" for Airframe and Powerplant) and later added the Inspection Authorization rating.
In 1950 he earned his Commercial pilot license and in 1954, his Multi-engine rating.
From 1955 until 1970 Bob worked for the Sinclair Oil Co. in their engine research laboratory.
Bushby died on October 14, 2018 in Joliet, Illinois. He was 91.

EAA
Bob was one of the original founders of the Experimental Aircraft Association in 1953, with EAA number 26. He is Technical Counselor number 20 and has attended every EAA national convention from 1953 through 2016. Bob was an early member of EAA Chapter 15, in 1956 was instrumental in forming EAA Chapter 95 and later contributed to the formation of EAA Chapter 260.
He conducted metal aircraft building forums at the Rockford and Oshkosh EAA fly-ins for 25 years.

Mustangs
The FAA pre-cover inspection of the first wing of his prototype Midget Mustang was January, 1953. 
Bob built his prototype version of the Midget, N15J, and first flew it on September 9, 1959. In 1959 he purchased the rights to the Midget Mustang and began to sell prints for the M-I. In San Antonio, Texas he built six Midget Mustang aircraft. In 1963 he began work on a two place design based on the Midget Mustang. In 1965 the first ever Mustang II (N1117M) was brought to the EAA convention at Rockford (by trailer) and in 1966 the prototype was flown to the convention. For the next 26 years Bushby Aeronautics sold plans and kits for the Mustang II. In March, 1992 Mustang Aeronautics, Inc. acquired the design rights from Robert Bushby for both the Midget Mustang and Mustang II aircraft. At the Homebuilder's Dinner at EAA AirVenture Oshkosh 2016, Bob received special recognition from the EAA commemorating 50 successful years of his Mustang II design.

Awards
1966 - Outstanding Design award (Third place) for Mustang II
1967 - August Raspet award 
1973 - August Raspet award
1986 - Stan Dzik award
1992 - Charles Taylor Master Mechanic Award
2005 - Wright Brothers Master Pilot Award
2016 - Recognition for his Mustang II design flying for 50 years

References

 Manufacturer's website - Mustang II History
 Robert Bushby biography
 My Dad - Robert Wesley Bushby

External links
Mustang Aeronautics website

1927 births
Aviators from Illinois
People from Joliet, Illinois
People from Minooka, Illinois
Commercial aviators
2018 deaths